Beyond the Gates is the second album by death metal band Possessed. Taking a different direction from their debut, Seven Churches, Beyond the Gates has a more technical feeling and, due to poor production, a muddy sound.

Reception was mixed, with some critics and fans being very disappointed by the album for the sound and production, while others were satisfied with the new direction of the band. Over the years, fans have slowly appreciated Beyond the Gates and have even considered it being an "underrated masterpiece" and "overlooked classic".

Beyond the Gates became a sign of Possessed's decline, as they only released the EP The Eyes of Horror before they officially disbanded the following year. This became the band’s last full length album, up until the release of their third studio album Revelations of Oblivion, 33 years later.

The vinyl release of the album featured an enhanced gatefold-style format: the "gates" of the front cover opened outward, exposing several flaps that opened further to reveal a large, nine-panel illustration of a line of demonic creatures approaching over a desert landscape. Lyrics were included on the inner sleeve.

Track listing
Published by Take Out Music.

Personnel
Possessed
Jeff Becerra – bass, vocals
Larry LaLonde – lead guitar
Mike Torrao – rhythm guitar
Mike Sus – drums

Production
Carl Canedy – producer
John Cuniberti, Tom Size – engineers
Tom Coyne – mastering
Steve Sinclair – executive producer

References

Possessed (band) albums
1986 albums
Combat Records albums
Albums with cover art by Ed Repka